The history of LGBT people in Iran spans thousands of years. Homosexuality has been viewed as a sin in Islam, and is outlawed in almost all Muslim-majority countries, including Iran. In pre-Islamic Iran, a tradition of homosexuality existed, however most were intolerant of pederasty and sexual activity between two men, especially the Zoroastrians. According to Ammianus Marcellinus, Iranians were “far from immoral relations with boys”. In fact, most were not tolerant of homosexuality until the invasion of the Ghaznavids and Seljuks.

Beginning in the mid-1980s, with the Islamic Government in power, as many as 7,000 homosexuals were hanged, shot, stoned, or burnt to death. Since the Iranian revolution in 1979, the punishment for homosexuality has been based on Sharia law, with the maximum penalty being death. Transgender people have never been officially addressed by the government leading up to the 1979 revolution, but, after the Islamic Revolution sex reassignment surgery has been allowed through Islamic Law. The government provides up to half the cost of the procedure for those needing financial assistance, upon the provision of necessary documents and supporting proof of an identity disorder.

Pre-Islamic period 
Ancient Iranian society had a tradition of polytheism and pederasty, which came into sharp conflict during the Achaemenid period. Iranian pederasty and its origins were debated even in ancient times – for example, Herodotus claimed they had learned it from the Greeks: "From the Greeks they have learned to lie with boys." 
However, Plutarch asserts that the Iranians used eunuch boys to that end long before contact between the cultures.
 In either case, Plato claimed they saw fit to forbid it to the inhabitants of the lands they occupied, since "It does not suit the rulers that their subjects should think noble thoughts, nor that they should form the strong friendships and attachments which these activities, and in particular love, tend to produce."

Sextus Empiricus writing in his "Outlines of Scepticism" (circa C.E 200) asserted that the laws of the Persians were tolerant of homosexual behavior, and the  men "indulge in intercourse with males" (1:152)

Around 250 BCE, during the Parthian Empire, the Zoroastrian text, the Vendidad, was written. It contains provisions that are part of sexual code promoting procreative sexuality that is interpreted to prohibit same-sex intercourse as a form of demon worship, and thus sinful. Ancient commentary on this passage suggests that those engaging in sodomy could be killed without permission from the Dastur. However, a strong homosexual tradition in Iran is attested to by Greek historians from the 5th century onward, and so the prohibition apparently had little effect on Iranian attitudes or sexual behavior outside the ranks of devout Zoroastrians in rural eastern Iran.

Islamic period 

There is a significant amount of Persian literature that explicitly illustrates the ancient existence of homosexuality among Iranians. In Persian poetry, references to sexual love can be found in addition to those of spiritual/religious love. More ghazals (love poems) and texts in Saadi's Bustan and Gulistan portray love between males than between male and female. In some poems, Sa'di's beloved is a young man, not a beautiful woman."

European travelers remarked on the taste that Shah Abbas of Iran (1588–1629) had for wine and festivities, but also for charming pages and cup bearers. A painting by Riza Abbasi with homo-erotic qualities shows the ruler enjoying such delights.

Pre-modern homosexuality 
Throughout his study historian Khaled El-Rouayheb has argued that same sex relations during the Islamic period contrasts from what is considered modern day homosexuality. His argument supports the notion of homosexuality as a concept that was only recently established as an identity.

The act of penetration between two men was previously regarded as an act of dominance rather than a sexual act - with one person presiding dominance over the other. The individual dominating the other person would be considered active and the other passive. Sexual acts involving individuals of the same sex were understood through the concept of passive and active participants rather than by gender. The man that was considered the passive participant was deplored due to it being seen as the more feminine role in comparison to the active participant who would be seen as more masculine and dominating.

A shift in the view of same-sex relation emerged during the nineteenth century. European influence created a separate narrative of what was considered homosexuality which resulted in Iran rejecting the idea of homosexuality altogether and embracing the concept of homosociality. Even still, this concept that men were participating in sexual practices with other men was still prevalent and seen as an act rather than a characteristic.

20th century Iran 

In 1914, Magnus Hirschfeld wrote that "sodomy, tribadism" was punishable with capital punishment under the Sublime State of Persia under "Shiite religious laws", however in the case of women, this only applied with the fourth convictions, the other previous three convictions received 100 lashes. Although he also stated that "In recent years, the religious penal code has been implemented very negligently in practice. No one at the German embassy has heard about a conviction as a result of the crime in question."

Under the rule of Mohammad Reza Pahlavi, the last monarch of the Pahlavi Dynasty, homosexuality was tolerated, even to the point of allowing news coverage of a same-sex wedding. In the late 1970s, some Iranians even began to talk about starting up a gay rights organization, similar to the Gay Liberation movement. Until the revolution, there were some night clubs in which gay behavior was tolerated. During the Shah's time, however, homosexuality was still taboo everywhere, and often one could not turn to family or friends for support and guidance. There were no public agencies to assist youth or people who were confused or questioning their sexuality:

Janet Afary has argued that the 1979 revolution was partly motivated by moral outrage against the Shah's regime, and in particular against a mock same-sex wedding between two young men with ties to the court.  She says that this explains the virulence of the anti-homosexual oppression in Iran.

Islamic Republic of Iran 

After the creation of the Islamic Republic of Iran, thousands of people were executed in public, including homosexuals. On September 12, 1979, Oriana Fallaci, Italian journalist, interviewed  Ayatollah Ruhollah Khomeini. She asked him if it was right to shoot homosexuals. He responded that some societies "where men are permitted to give themselves to satisfy other men's desires", and that "the society that we want to build does not permit such things. When she responded about the "boy they shot yesterday, for sodomy.", he responded "Corruption, corruption. We have to eliminate corruption." A 1987 report of the United Nations Commission on Human Rights estimated that as many as 7,000 people were shot, hanged, stoned or burned to death after the 1979 revolution.

The new religious government that came to be established after the 1979 Iranian Revolution classed transsexuals and transvestites with gays and lesbians, who were condemned by Islam and faced the punishment of lashing and death under Iran's penal code. In 1986, transsexuals were re-classified as being "heterosexual".

Since the 1979 Iranian revolution, the legal code has been based on Islamic Shari'a law. All sexual relations that occur outside a traditional, heterosexual marriage (i.e. sodomy or adultery) are illegal and no legal distinction is made between consensual or non-consensual sodomy. Homosexual relations that occur between consenting adults in private are a crime and carry a maximum punishment of death . Forced homosexual relations (rape) often results in execution. The death penalty is legal for those above 18, and if a murder was committed, legal at the age of 15. (see Mahmoud Asgari and Ayaz Marhoni whose ages were raised to 19 in court transcripts). Approved by the Iranian Parliament on July 30, 1991, and finally ratified by the Guardian Council on November 28, 1991, articles 108 through 140 distinctly talk about homosexuality and its punishments in detail.

On September 24, 2007, while speaking at Columbia University, Iranian President Mahmoud Ahmadinejad said, in answer to the question "Iranian women are now denied basic human rights and your government has imposed draconian punishments including execution on Iranian citizens who are homosexuals. Why are you doing those things?", "We don't have homosexuals, like in your country.  I don't know who told you that." An aide later said that he was misquoted and was actually saying that "compared to American society, we don't have many homosexuals". The aide further clarified that "because of historical, religious and cultural differences homosexuality is less common in Iran and the Islamic world than in the West". A book on this topic is Women with mustaches and men without beards: gender and sexual anxieties of Iranian modernity by Afsaneh Najmabadi.

Transgender rights 

One early campaigner for transsexual rights is Maryam Hatoon Molkara. Before the revolution, she had longed to transition physically to female but could not afford surgery. Furthermore, she wanted religious authorization. Since 1975, she had been writing letters to Ayatollah Khomeini, who was to become the leader of the revolution and was in exile. After the revolution, she was fired, forcedly injected with testosterone, and institutionalized. She was later released with help from her connection, and she kept lobbying many other leaders. Later she went to see Khomeini, who had returned to Iran. At first she was stopped and beaten by his guards, but eventually, Khomeini gave her a letter to authorize her sex reassignment operation. The letter is later known as the fatwa that authorizes such operations in Iran. The advancement of trans rights and the legal status of trans-identified individuals in Iran was pivoted by Maryam Hatoon Molkara by not only by securing the fatwa for herself, but for the other trans people in Iran.

The Legal Medicine Organization of Iran made available certifications to transgenders. This led to opportunities for trans identified people to gain authorization for gender change surgery, hormonal procedures, health insurance, aid with financial and social issues, and new identification records. Nonetheless, those who have undergone gender reassignment surgery experience exclusivity in society, discrimination, possible rejection from family members, gender-based violence, and issues with employment. These issues have often led to the higher rate of homelessness and substance abuse within the trans community. Although the illegality of same-sex intercourse and activities had not been thoroughly addressed, the legal differences between the LGB and trans-identified Iranians are critical. Gaining social acceptance for the entire LGBT community as a whole was not of priority for government officials in Iran. Since same-sex conduct is criminalized, gender reassignment surgery became state-sanctioned as the cure for homosexuality, heteronormalizing people who have same-sex desires or engage in same-sex practices. Historian Afsaneh Najmabadi has articulated concerns that LGB identified persons have been encouraged to have gender reassignment surgery done to be socially accepted in Iran. Progressive actions for the trans community in Iran have led to social and legal isolation, institutional violence, and oppression for LGBT members who don't identify as transgender.

References

Persecution by Muslims
LGBT in Iran
Iran